Sydney Hinam (29 August 1898 – 16 August 1982) was a Welsh rugby union and professional rugby league footballer who played in the 1920s.

Background
Sydney Hinam was born in Pontypool, Wales, and he died aged 83 in Cardiff, Wales.

Playing career

International honours
Sydney Hinam won caps for Wales (RU) while at Cardiff RFC in 1925 against Ireland, and England, and in 1926 against Scotland, Ireland, and France.

County honours
Sydney Hinam played left-, i.e. number 10, in Glamorgan's 18-14 victory over Monmouthshire in the non-County Championship match during the 1926–27 season at Taff Vale Park, Pontypridd on Saturday 30 April 1927.

References

External links
Search for "Hinam" at rugbyleagueproject.org
Statistics at wru.co.uk

1898 births
1982 deaths
Cardiff RFC players
Glamorgan Police officers
Footballers who switched code
Glamorgan Police RFC players
Glamorgan rugby league team players
Rochdale Hornets players
Rugby league players from Pontypool
Rugby league props
Rugby union flankers
Rugby union players from Pontypool
Wales international rugby union players
Welsh police officers
Welsh rugby league players
Welsh rugby union players